9 is the seventh studio album by Public Image Ltd, but their ninth full-length release including the live albums Paris au Printemps and Live in Tokyo. It was released in May 1989 on the Virgin Records label (see 1989 in music).

Background
The band that recorded 9 consisted of John Lydon, bassist Allan Dias, guitarist John McGeoch and drummer Bruce Smith. Former guitarist Lu Edmonds left the band by the time the album was recorded due to problems with tinnitus. However, Edmonds received a writing co-credit on all tracks, although he does not play on the album. Ted Chau, who replaced Edmonds in the band, does not perform on 9.

The album was produced by Stephen Hague, Eric "ET" Thorngren, and the band. Bill Laswell, who had produced Album three years earlier, had originally been lined up to produce 9. However, tension between Laswell and Lydon after the recording of that album, coupled with Laswell's desire to once again use his own cast of session musicians on 9 and his dissatisfaction with Public Image's new line-up, led to the agreement being cancelled.

The first album track to be released was "Warrior", which showed up on the soundtrack album to the movie Slaves of New York, released on 20 March 1989. The track "Sand Castles in the Snow" was originally titled "Spit", and was so listed in various Virgin pre-release information.

Track listing
All tracks composed by Dias, Edmonds, Lydon, McGeoch and Smith except "Disappointed" (Dias, Edmonds, Lydon, McGeoch, Smith and Hague)

Personnel
Public Image Ltd.
John Lydon - vocals
John McGeoch - guitar
Allan Dias - bass
Bruce Smith - drums, percussion, programming

Track-by-track commentary by the band
"Happy":
John Lydon (1989): “'Happy?' was much more militant in its approach, kind of pissed off at the world. That was the attitude. But this one is much more happy, much more open. I think it sums up the sense of optimism that really has to be there for these very serious times we live in [...] There is a theme running through [the songs] [...] It's not to take life so seriously, actually, and not to expect too much from anyone, which will at least give them a chance. And that is optimism [...] The songs really were written much, much more for live than record. They were completely and totally rehearsed before they went anywhere near the studio. So the actual recording process was very, very quick. Took us a year to write, and very well worthwhile.” “We spent a lot of time writing these songs and perfecting them before we went anywhere near a studio to record them. I think that's the main effort of our work, isn't it?”  “I had doubts from the start, but nevertheless I flew to New York with a tape of our songs. Suddenly [Bill Laswell] said he hates our songs, the band is crap and I better fire them and work with the songs he wrote for me. His idea for me was to make some kind of U2 album. So we packed our bags and fucked off.” “Originally we were going to do this with Bill Laswell, but he said the band couldn't play and he hated all our songs, so I told him where to go. We moved to Jason Corsaro, and then that all fell through, so I took it all back to England. It was financially impossible after the Laswell fuck-up. Laswell's ego has become ridiculous, I couldn't deal with it. He said he'd written songs and I should sack the band and use his people and come out with a U2-type product! To me that reeks of cliché and cop-out. It's very disappointing [...] I won't be dictated to by producers. That's not their job, as far as I'm concerned, their job is clarity, and if you're doing something wrong, to point an easier way around it. Y'know, useful tools. Steve is a musician, and it's very useful to work with people in that way. Eric Thorngren is more like a mad Hells Angel [...] [Lu Edmonds] helped in the writing [...] It's the actual writing of the thing that counts. I'm not going to take anything away from Lu at the moment, life's very hard on him. It's a terrible thing to take a year off of your chosen profession.” “I realise that our new album sounds almost too good and that there's going to be a lot of criticism that we've sold out, but we wanted to make a really professional pop album, so to hell with the critics. Why did we work with guys who produce mainstream acts like Pet Shop Boys and Talking Heads? We didn't have much of a choice, to be honest. We were originally booked to record the album in Los Angeles [sic] with another producer, but on the very day we were due to start, he informed us that the songs stunk and that no one could play.”
Allan Dias (1989/2004): “We miss Lu. It was a shock to have to go in and record without him after he had been involved in the songwriting [...] We put a lot of time into arrangements and melody. This album is more integration of rhythms and melody rather than just really hard grooves on their own.” “We give [John Lydon] a cassette, he'll take it away. Two months later you ask him about it, and he'll say 'It's too nice, I don't know what to do with it!' In the final hour he'll come up with something brilliant.” “We would all have cassettes with some ideas and some songs, and then we would exchange them. We would listen to each others stuff, and I'd pick what I like from their stuff, and they'd pick what they like from mine, whatever. And then we'd sit and try to play this stuff or try to structure it. Sometimes we'd use bits and pieces from each others tunes, yeah. We shared everything equally so it didn't matter whose song initially it was. I think McGeoch was probably the more prolific writer. I think if an album had ten songs, usually four or five came from John McGeoch, three of four would come from me and the others, and then John Lydon would have a couple.”
Bruce Smith (1989): “There were strong characters involved, but it didn't make one character. Rotten's vocals and the music and the compositions have gelled together. On the last record we made, it wasn't there at all [...] I think some of the tracks might suffer from the final mix being a little too smooth, but I certainly would have done it like that.”
Bill Laswell (producer, 1989): “He's lost it. Ask him why he delivered a bad disco album.”
John McGeoch (1990/91): “I don't think '9' was a bummer, but looking back with the luxury of hindsight, I'm more content with 'Happy?'. We in fact started to record '9' with Bill Laswell, but Bill was just out of order I'm afraid. Lydon sacked him on the second day. He wanted to make a heavy metal album. He had us round and it was nothing less than a lecture that he gave us, that the American public needed John Lydon to make a tough heavy metal album. The material that we had written for '9' was written on computers, as was the new stuff, and he said 'This is just disco!' He wanted to throw out Allan and Bruce and use his own musicians.” “When we recorded '9', the engineer Dave Meegan recorded a lot of it digitally, but then went and used my noisy old washing machine rack to master it, to get that analogue feel.”
Lu Edmonds (1999): “I think Virgin always wanted Bill Laswell to get involved again, the second time for '9' there was this complete fiasco [...] Virgin negotiated with Laswell on a very flimsy basis to record '9', and Laswell was saying 'Well, the only way I ever record an album is with my own musicians,' and Virgin would go 'Don't worry, we'll send the band anyway, and if you like them you can use them,' and Laswell's going 'It's up to you if you want to take the risk, but if I don't like the band I'm not going to use them!' We went into the studio on the first day, and he made Bruce so nervous by being so cool, he's Mr Cool, and Bruce did all the songs at kind of double speed, he was so nervous. And that night Laswell turned to John and said 'The band won't do!' We'd been there a week – we were committed to be there for three – and Virgin said 'Well, we did think that might happen.' And suddenly the band are $80,000 in the hole, John was absolutely livid! [...]  After this time when we were in New York with Laswell, we did the Estonian date [...] then after that gig I suddenly realised my ears were just – I'd had a little tinnitus. Then it got really bad and I went to see a doctor, and he said 'You've got to stop playing.' [...] And I just fell into a huge pit of depression, everything in my life just collapsed. I had to get out and I thought it was better I got out before I was on the album [...] I didn't take any advances for '9' but John gave me the royalties [...] They ended up with Stephen Hague, who also is a great producer, but again, '9' was completely sucked dry of any scruffiness and all that beautiful space. So for me those albums are disappointing because I know they could have been better.”

"Disappointed":
John Lydon (1989/99): "'Disappointed' is what it says, it's just about the many and varied ways people let you down." "But, you know, that's what people will always do. You can't change the human race. You've just got to accept that as a fact of life." "Friends will let you down, but that doesn't mean you shouldn't have friends. You should enjoy it for the very fact that they are human beings and fallible, that that very fallibility is what you should enjoy about human contact. Otherwise, really what you're asking for is sycophantic robots that merely compliment your ego. And there's no enjoyment in that."
John McGeoch (1991). "I was doing some work at Eel Pie Studios five or six years ago and Townshend had left some guitar cases lying around the place. I opened one up and there was an acoustic guitar with a receipt dated 1969 [...] The tuning on the guitar was D-A-D-A-D-E, bottom to top. That's what I used on 'Disappointed'."

"Warrior":
John Lydon (1989/2004): "That's precisely how I see myself – fighting off, instead of the US Cavalry, boredom and oppression." "I'm making my case quite clear that this is my land and I'm not gonna surrender it easily. I'm sick of damn big businesses just burning up everything, destroying the food, destroying the sea, polluting the air. You know, I've got an actual birthright to these things – I'm damned if I'm gonna surrender it lightly." "When you look at 'Warrior' [...] there's all kind of MIDI keyboarding but it sounds like a band live."

U.S.L.S. 1":
John Lydon (1989): "It should be pronounced 'Useless One', it concerns your president. It's about a terrorist bomb on Air Force One. It poses the question, how would Mr. Bush feel if he knew? I don't write anything purely just for atmosphere, that would be boring. Things have to have a point to them."
Bruce Smith (1989): "One thing that is good about this new record is that several of the tunes are from what Lydon did at home on machines, really far-out pieces of music, really fucking great."

Related tracks
"Warrior" (extended mix):
John Lydon (1989/2004): "Virgin, in fact all labels, had cut back on making vinyl for a while, and it was a real problem with them. So we decided to do an extended dance mix of 'Warrior'. That was a serious club anthem at the time." "It's too easy to do an atypical Public Image-type record – big, crashing drums and whooping great imitation reggae basslines. All that stuff's been done and I don't wanna do it any more. I'm much more interested in other directions. Now, if people conceive that as being commercial on my part, then I'd like them to define commercial because the record sales really aren't that hot. But we are imitated, and I think you'll find quite a lot of '9'-sounding albums out there in the charts next year, all of them no doubt hogging the Top 10 spot."

"Don't Ask Me" (single a-side):
John McGeoch (1990/91): "Lydon loved 'Don't Ask Me'. Allan wrote the music, but when we put the guitars on it, he thought it sounded almost like a Pistols song or something." "The producer had a lovely collection of guitars so I just let him dictate which ones I used. We ended up doing straightforward rhythm on a Les Paul, double-tracking that on the Carvin and then putting some Prince-type dry rhythm guitar over the top on an early '50s Telecaster with about a three-figure serial number."
John Lydon (1990/92): "It wasn't my idea to do a Greatest Hits, it was the record company's. Originally, they only wanted eight songs it, I put it up to thirteen. And then we added a new one which was floating around, just for good measure – to give people value for money." "There was actually a problem with the record company at the time, in that they didn't press enough copies of the single – and it went straight in the charts and then it couldn't sell any more because they didn't press any [...] So it's almost impossible for us to have hits if they continue this way!"
Allan Dias (2004): "I sat down and wrote 'Don't Ask Me' specifically as a pop song. I even wrote the lyrics, John used about 80% of my lyrics. It was funny cos when we were going over it at his house in L.A. I gave him a little sheet with the lyrics, and he's singing it, and then he turned and said 'Are you sure I didn't write this?' [...] Obviously he changed some words around, but I was chuffed, man! [...] I'd only came to L.A. with one tune, I had one tune on a cassette, but I'd worked on that tune for three or four months [...] I hate that version that's out, it's so soft. You should have heard my version, it was cutting, it kicked! [...] They softened it up, they made it sort of MTV-friendly or whatever [...] I had a demo that had everything on there. I was using computers back then, so I had it all on disc, I had all the programming, and I think we just set it up in the studio and transferred all my stuff to the multi-track and did it from there"

"Rise" (Bob Clearmountain remix):
John McGeoch (1990): "We felt at liberty to fuck with the new stuff, the part two of PIL stuff. Bob Clearmountain for instance remixed 'Rise'."
John Lydon (1990): "Oh yes, The Greatest Hits, So Far – buy it, I need the money, I'm a pauper! And P.S., get this, right – the whole reason I was invited here actually was to promote 'Rise', the remix, as a single. Lo and behold, I found out yesterday morning that Virgin have refused to release it, because they say they don't have the budget. Is this the record company I need to be on? No!"

Charts

United Kingdom
9 entered the UK Albums Chart, where it stayed for 2 weeks and reached No. 36 on 10 June 1989.
The single “Disappointed” entered the UK Top 75, where it stayed for 5 weeks and reached No. 38 on 6 May 1989.
The single “Don't Ask Me” entered the UK Top 75, where it stayed for 5 weeks and reached No. 22 on 20 October 1990.

United States
9 entered the Billboard 200 album charts. It stayed there for 23 weeks and reached No. 106 on 8 July 1989. It is Public Image Ltd's last album to chart there.
The single “Warrior” entered the Billboard Modern Rock Tracks charts, where it stayed for 7 weeks and reached No. 16 on 6 May 1989. When it was re-released as a dance remix single later in the year, it entered the Billboard Hot Dance Club Play Songs charts, where it stayed for 10 weeks and reached No. 16 on 16 December 1989.
The single “Disappointed” entered the Billboard Modern Rock Tracks charts, where it stayed for 13 weeks and reached No. 1 on 29 July 1989. It also entered the Billboard Hot Dance Club Play Songs charts, where it stayed for 5 weeks and reached No. 26 on 8 July 1989.
A remix of “Happy” was released as a promo 12-inch single which entered the Billboard Modern Rock Tracks charts, where it stayed for 5 weeks and reached No. 15 on 23 September 1989.
The single “Don't Ask Me” entered the Billboard Modern Rock Tracks charts, where it stayed for 14 weeks and reached No. 2 on 24 November 1990.

References 

1989 albums
Public Image Ltd albums
Albums produced by Stephen Hague
Virgin Records albums